Eremopedes is a genus of shield-backed katydids in the family Tettigoniidae. There are about 16 described species in Eremopedes.

Species
These 16 species belong to the genus Eremopedes:

 Eremopedes ateloploides (Caudell, 1907)
 Eremopedes balli Caudell, 1902 (Ball's shieldback)
 Eremopedes bilineatus (Thomas, 1875) (two-lined shieldback)
 Eremopedes californica Rentz, 1972
 Eremopedes colonialis Rentz, 1972
 Eremopedes covilleae Hebard, 1934
 Eremopedes cryptoptera (Rehn & Hebard, 1920)
 Eremopedes cylindricerca Rentz, 1972
 Eremopedes ephippiata Tinkham, 1944
 Eremopedes kelsoensis Tinkham, 1972 (kelso shieldback)
 Eremopedes pintiati Rentz, 1972
 Eremopedes scudderi Cockerell, 1898
 Eremopedes shrevei Tinkham, 1944
 Eremopedes sonorensis Tinkham, 1944
 Eremopedes subcarinatus (Caudell, 1907)
 Eremopedes tectinota Rentz, 1972

References

Further reading

 

Tettigoniinae
Articles created by Qbugbot